Penedo is a district in the Itatiaia municipality, located in the southern region of Rio de Janeiro state, in Brazil. Founded as a vegan commune by Finnish settlers, it is now a Finland-themed tourist destination.

References

External links 

Finnish diaspora
Itatiaia